Alexander Napier may refer to:
 Alexander Napier (1st Laird of Merchiston) (died )
 Alexander Napier (2nd Laird of Merchiston) (died )
 Alexander Napier, Lord Laurieston (–1629)
 Several of the Napier baronets:
 Sir Alexander Napier, de jure 4th Baronet (died 1702)
 Sir Alexander Lennox Napier, 11th Baronet (1882–1954)
 Alex Napier (born 1935), Scottish footballer
 Alex Napier (cricketer), Australian international cricketer
 Alex Napier (drummer) (1947–2023), English drummer (Uriah Heep)